Desert Stateline Solar Facility is a 300 MWp (about 250 MWAC) utility-scale solar photovoltaic power station constructed by First Solar in San Bernardino County in California, USA. It is located at the base of Clark Mountain in California, across the state line from Primm, Nevada, and adjacent to the Ivanpah Solar Power Facility.

The project uses approximately 3.2 million panels from First Solar, an amount similar to the 250 MWAC Moapa Southern Paiute Solar Project.

The plant's first 150 megawatts (MW) came online in late 2015, and it entered full commercial operation in the third quarter of 2016. In September 2015, it was announced that Southern Company had purchased a controlling interest in the project. First Solar continues to operate the facility. Power is sold to Southern California Edison under a 20-year power purchase agreement.

Electricity production

See also
Silver State South Solar Project
List of photovoltaic power stations

References

External links

Solar power in the Mojave Desert
Buildings and structures in San Bernardino County, California
Solar power stations in California